Imitative learning is a type of social learning whereby new behaviors are acquired via imitation.  Imitation aids in communication, social interaction, and the ability to modulate one's emotions to account for the emotions of others, and is "essential for healthy sensorimotor development and social functioning". The ability to match one's actions to those observed in others occurs in humans and animals; imitative learning plays an important role in humans in cultural development. Imitative learning is different from observational learning in that it requires a duplication of the behaviour exhibited by the model, whereas observational learning can occur when the learner observes an unwanted behaviour and its subsequent consequences and as a result learns to avoid that behaviour.

Imitative learning in animals 
On the most basic level, research performed by A.L. Saggerson, David N. George, and R.C. Honey showed that pigeons were able to learn a basic process that would lead to the delivery of a reward by watching a demonstrator pigeon.  A demonstrator pigeon was trained to peck a panel in response to one stimulus (e.g. a red light) and hop on the panel in response to a second stimulus (e.g. a green light).  After proficiency in this task was established in the demonstrator pigeon, other learner pigeons were placed in a video-monitored observation chamber.  After every second observed trial, these learner pigeons were then individually placed in the demonstrator pigeon's box and presented the same test.  The learner pigeons displayed competent performance on the task, and thus it was concluded that the learner pigeons had formed a response-outcome association while observing.  However, the researchers noted that an alternative interpretation of these results could be that the learner pigeons had instead acquired outcome-response associations that guided their behavior and that further testing was needed to establish if this was a valid alternative.

A similar study was conducted by Chesler, which compared kittens learning to press a lever for food after seeing their mother do it to kittens who had not. A stimulus in the form of a flickering light was presented, after which the kitten has to press a lever in order to obtain a food reward. The experiment tested the responses of three groups of kittens: those that observed their mother's performance first before attempting the task, those that observed a strange female's performance, and those that did not have a demonstrator and had to complete it through trial and error (the control group). The study found that the kittens that observed their mother before attempting the task acquired the lever-pressing response faster than the kittens that observed a strange female's response. The kittens conducting the task through trial and error never acquired the response. This result suggests that the kittens learned from imitating a model. The study also speculates whether the primacy of imitative learning, as opposed to trial end error, was due to a social and biological response to the mother (a type of learning bias).

Whether true imitation occurs in animals is a debated topic. For an action to be an instance of imitative learning, an animal must observe and reproduce the specific pattern of movements produced by the model. Some researchers have proposed evidence that true imitation does not occur in non-primates, and that the observational learning exhibited involves less cognitively complex means such as stimulus enhancement.

Chimpanzees are more apt to learning by emulation rather than true imitation. The exception is encultured chimpanzees, which are chimpanzees raised as if they were children. In one study by Buttelman et al., encultured chimpanzees were found to behave similarly to young children and imitate even those actions that were non instrumental to achieving the desired goal. In other studies of true imitation, encultered chimpanzees even imitated the behaviour of a model some time after initially observing it.

Imitative learning in humans 
Imitative learning has been well documented in humans; they are often used as a comparison group in studies of imitative learning in primates. A study by Horner and Whiten compared the actions of (non-encultured) chimpanzees to human children and found that the children over-imitated actions beyond necessity. In the study, children and chimpanzees between the ages of 3-4 were shown a series of actions to open an opaque puzzle box with a reward inside. Two of the actions were necessary to open the box, but one was not, however this was not known by the subjects. A demonstrator performed all three actions to open the box, after which both the chimpanzees and the children attempted the task. Both the children and the chimpanzees copied all three of the behaviours and received the reward inside of the box. The next phase of the study involved a transparent box instead of the opaque box. Due to the transparency of this box, it could clearly be seen that one of the three actions was not necessary to receive the reward. The chimpanzees did not perform the unnecessary action and only performed the two actions necessary to achieve the desired goal. The young children imitated all three actions, despite the fact that they could have selectively ignored irrelevant actions.

One explanation for this is that humans follow conventions. A study by Clegg and Legare tested this by demonstrating a method of making a necklace to young children. In demonstrations, the model added a step which was not necessary for the achievement of the final goal of completing the necklace. In one demonstration, the model used a language cue to inform the children that the making of the necklace is instrumental, e.g., “I am going to make a necklace. Let’s watch what I am doing. I am going to make a necklace.” In another demonstration, the model used language cues to imply that they were making the necklace according to convention, e.g., “I always do it this way. Everyone always does it this way. Let’s watch what I am doing. Everyone always does it this way.” In the conventional condition, children copied the model with more fidelity, including the unnecessary step. In the instrumental condition, they did not copy the unnecessary step. The study suggests that children discern when to imitate, viewing convention as a salient reason for copying behaviour in order to fit in with the convention. Taking cues for proper behaviour from the actions of others, rather than using independent judgement, is called a conformity bias.

Recent research has shown that humans are also subject to other biases when selecting whose behaviour to imitate. Humans imitate individuals they deem successful in the field they also wish to be successful in (success bias), as well respected, prestigious individuals that others preferentially learn from (prestige bias). In a study by Chudek et al., an attentional cue was used to indicate to children that a particular model was prestigious. In an experiment with two models playing with a toy in different ways, prestige was indicated by two observers watching the prestigious model for 10 seconds. The study found that children picked up on the cue that signified prestige and preferentially imitated the prestigious model. The study suggests that such biases help humans pick up direct and indirect cues that an individual possesses knowledge that is worth learning.

These cues can lead to humans imitating harmful behaviours. Copycat suicides occur when the person attempting suicide copies the method of a suicide attempt they had heard about or seen in the media, with a significant rise in attempts seen after celebrity suicides (see Werther effect). Suicides can spread through social networks like an epidemic due large groups of people imitating the behaviour of a model or group of models (see Blue Whale Challenge).

References 

Behavioral concepts
Learning
Social learning theory